Four cities submitted bids to host the 2019 Pan American Games and Parapan games that were recognized by the Pan American Sports Organization (PASO), all four of which made the PASO Executive Committee's shortlist. PASO selected a host city for the 2019 Pan American Games at the Westin Harbour Castle Hotel in Toronto, Canada on October 11, 2013, which Lima won. The other shortlisted cities were Santiago, Chile, La Punta, Argentina, and Ciudad Bolívar, Venezuela.

Lima won an absolute majority of votes after just one round of voting, eliminating the need for subsequent rounds of voting. PASO delegates and the media identified a number of factors in its favor, including the size of the country, safety, experience in staging multi sporting events, government guarantees, security and cleanliness.

Host city selection 
On  May 1, 2013, the National Olympic Committee (NOC) members of PASO were informed of the confirmation of the four candidate cities to host the 2019 Pan American Games. Each city was required to pay a deposit of $50,000 by that date, in which each one fulfilled, in order to continue with the election process. From April 30 to May 8, the Evaluation Commission carried out its visits to Ciudad Bolivar, La Punta, Santiago de Chile and Lima, in that order.

Lima was selected as the host city for the 2019 Pan American Games on October 11, 2013 by PASO at the Westin Harbour Castle Hotel in Toronto, Canada on October 11, 2013.

Candidate cities overview

Candidate cities

Candidate cities venues list
Note that the selected candidate cities may have slightly changed venues plan in the final proposal to PASO.

Showed preliminary interest in bidding 
 Bogotá, Colombia 
  Puerto Rico 
A number of cities had been mentioned as possible bids from Puerto Rico such as San Juan, Ponce, Mayagüez and Caguas.

 San Salvador, El Salvador
 Miami, United States
During the 2011 Pan American Games, United States Olympic Committee chief Scott Blackmun said that the United States would be interested in hosting the Pan American Games at some point. Miami had been mentioned as a potential bidder for the 2019 Games.

 Montevideo, Uruguay

References

2019 Pan American Games
Bids for the Pan American Games